Avahan is an initiative sponsored by the Bill & Melinda Gates Foundation to reduce the spread of HIV in India.  It began in 2003.  As of 2009 the Gates Foundation had pledged  to the programme. The programme aims to reduce HIV transmission and the prevalence of STIs in vulnerable high-risk populations, notably female sex workers, MSM, and transgender people, through prevention education and services such as condom promotion, STI management, behaviour change communication, community mobilisation, and advocacy. Avahan works in six states, whilst India HIV/AIDS Alliance is the state lead partner in Andhra Pradesh. By 2013, control of the program transitioned to the Government of India.

Founding
The Bill & Melinda Gates Foundation launched Avahan in 2003 for the purpose of developing a model HIV prevention system in India and promoting others in India and worldwide to adapt and adopt their model.

Strategy
Rather than staffing HIV prevention workers on its own, Avahan provides government health organisations and NGOs with the tools they need to conduct HIV prevention on their own.  Avahan's primary prevention techniques include the following:
 training social workers to do peer education
 funding sexually transmitted infection (STI) testing and treatment
 distributing condoms
 forcing communities who receive any aid to take total responsibility for the management of that aid
 funding social media to reduce stigma associated with STIs
 fostering access to HIV care and treatment

Communication difficulty
In 2005 an internal report determined that local people and even peer outreach workers had difficulty understanding the nature of Avahan's funded community partners.  Specifically, local people had trouble understanding what services Avahan clinics and educators were offering.

Impact
In October 2011 a study published in The Lancet concluded that between 2003-8 in areas where the Avahan project was active the program lowered community rates of HIV acquisition with an increase in protection relative to increased funding per person.

References

External links
 Avahan

2003 establishments in India
HIV/AIDS in India
Bill & Melinda Gates Foundation
HIV/AIDS organizations
Organizations established in 2003
Medical and health organisations based in India